Sir John William Ackerman, KCMG, (1825–1905) was mayor of Pietermaritzburg and, for twelve years, speaker of the Natal Legislative Council.

Ackerman is buried at City of Westminster Cemetery, Hanwell.

See also
 List of mayors of Pietermaritzburg
 Timeline of Pietermaritzburg

References 

1825 births
1905 deaths
People from Pietermaritzburg
Knights Commander of the Order of St Michael and St George
South African knights